Axiocerses jacksoni is a butterfly in the family Lycaenidae. It was described by Stempffer in 1948. It is found in Ethiopia, Somalia and northern Kenya.

References

Butterflies described in 1948
Axiocerses